The 3rd Army Corps is a military formation of the Russian Ground Forces formed in June 2022 to participate in the 2022 Russian invasion of Ukraine. The 3rd Corps was raised in response to the depletion of trained manpower during the early months of the invasion. It was formed exclusively by volunteers, as at that point Russia had not yet begun the process of partial mobilization and preferred to avoid or delay doing so. Recruitment was on a regional basis, with federal subject administrations and local authorities conducting recruitment campaigns. Its current effective strength estimated at 15,500–60,000 personnel as of January 2023, and belongs to the Western Military District.

Designation 
In Russian military jargon, an "Army Corps" is typically a formation larger than a division, but significantly smaller than a typical Western corps, often directly commanding separate brigades.

The proxy militias of the Donetsk People's Republic (DPR) and the Luhansk People's Republic (LPR) are operationally designated as the 1st and 2nd Army Corps respectively. As a force similar in composition and operational purpose to these formations, the new volunteer formation raised was designated the 3rd Army Corps.

Creation

The 3rd Army Corps' initial main base and training centre was identified by Ukraine in August 2022 as being located in Mulino, Nizhny Novgorod Oblast. The new 72nd Separate Motor Rifle Brigade, intended to form part of the 3rd Army Corps, was reported by Penza Oblast authorities to be forming at Totskoye, Orenburg Oblast.

Recruitment
The 3rd Army Corps is believed to be composed primarily or wholly of volunteer units newly raised on a regional basis, with various federal subjects of Russia recruiting individual units.

Recruitment posters, looking to raise volunteer battalions from across Russia, set the age limit as 18 to 50. Recruits were offered sign-on bonuses (up to 300,000 rubles in some cases) with salaries of 200,000 rubles being around three times average monthly pay in Russia, sometimes linked to bonuses based on performance with insurance in case of injury or death. Terms of service was often given 6 months and training would, in some cases, be one month.

By 8 August 2022, some 40 battalions from 19 regions had been formed, many with less than the authorized paper strength of 400 men. There is a general shortage of officers and experienced men to train the recruits, partly due to the deployment of training cadres to the front lines to replace losses.

Equipment
 

Equipment delivered to the training area at Mulino included new-generation AK-12 assault rifles, modern T-80BVM and Т-90М tanks, BMP-3 infantry fighting vehicles, and Buk SAMs. Some of the newest equipment was likely from stockpiles in the Moscow area used for parades and the like. T-80BV and T-90M tanks and Buk SAM complexes were seen being shipped by rail to staging areas in Rostov Oblast near the DPR border, and 2A65 Msta-B 152mm howitzers were video-recorded being towed to the front in occupied Kharkiv Oblast.

BMPT Terminator armored fighting vehicles with 3rd Army Corps markings were seen near Svatove, Luhansk Oblast in December 2022 and January 2023.

Deployment to Ukraine
Equipment designated for the 3rd Army Corps was shipped in late August 2022 to Neklinovka station in northwestern Rostov Oblast, close to the DPR border and the Sea of Azov, to prepare for deployment to the Donbas front.

As a result of the Ukrainian counteroffensives in southern and northeastern Ukraine, the volunteer battalions of the 3rd Army Corps were deployed piecemeal to reinforce the Kherson, Kharkiv, Melitopol, and Mariupol sectors.

On September 9, during the Ukrainian Kharkiv counteroffensive, footage appeared of a military column with 3rd Army Corps markings headed towards the front in Kharkiv Oblast. The 3rd Army Corps rushed to join Russian forces in Kharkiv Oblast. Then it joined the Russian retreat, leaving behind tanks, infantry fighting vehicles, and personnel carriers: it "melted away" according to Forbes, having little or no impact on the battlefield along with other irregular forces. Afterwards, reserves and equipment of the 3rd Army Corps were reportedly moved to reinforce units in Donetsk Oblast and Zaporizhzhia Oblast.

Morale and effectiveness
Reports of low morale, drunkenness, low quality training, poor quality and shortages of equipment dogged the 3rd Army Corps in the first three months of its existence.

See also 
 1st Army Corps
 2nd Army Corps
 2022 Russian mobilization

References 

Military units and formations established in 2022
2022 establishments in Russia
Army corps of the Russian Federation